Argentina fielded six competitors at the 2009 World Championships in Athletics in Berlin.

Team selection

Track and road events

Field and combined events

Results

Men
Track and road events

Field and combined events

Women
Field and combined events

References

External links
Official competition website

Nations at the 2009 World Championships in Athletics
World Championships in Athletics
Argentina at the World Championships in Athletics